Alexander Grigoriev may refer to:

 Alexander Grigoriev (bellfounder) (c. 1634 – after 1676), Russian cannon and bellmaker
 Alexander Grigoryev (1949–2008), Russian security services official
 Aleksandr Grigoryev (athlete) (born 1955), Russian high jumper
 Alexander Grigoriev (artist) (1891–1961), Mari Soviet artist, public figure and academician
 Alexander Grigoryev, a character in The Two Captains by Veniamin Kaverin

See also
 Grigoryev